Haji Abul Hossain Institute of Technology or (HABHIT) is a polytechnic institute in Tangail, Bangladesh established in 2000.

Departments

Undergraduate programs  
Business Administration (BBA)
Computer Science & Engineering (CSE)

Diploma programs  
Civil
Computer
Electrical
Electronics
Telecommunication
Textile
Garments Design & Pattern Making
Pathology
Dental
computer 4

Festival

Youth Festival 

Youth Festival 2017
HABHIT Youth Festival is an annual gathering of youth students. It is organized by Haji Abul Hossain Trust. Around 6,000 talented young students will participate in various activities in Youth Festival to promote confidence and spirit in the youth.

Faculty

Hostel  
(Boys Hostel) Collage Para, Tangail
(Girls Hostel) Pardighulia, Tangail

References

External links
 https://web.archive.org/web/20190101112829/http://habhit.edu.bd/
 https://www.facebook.com/habhit.edu.bd

Colleges in Tangail District
Universities and colleges in Dhaka
Educational institutions established in 2000
Polytechnic institutes in Bangladesh
2000 establishments in Bangladesh